Indiana Jones and the Kingdom of the Crystal Skull is a 2008 American action adventure film directed by Steven Spielberg and written by David Koepp, from a story by Jeff Nathanson and franchise creator George Lucas. The fourth installment in the Indiana Jones series, it was released and takes place 19 years after the previous film. Set in 1957, it pits Indiana Jones (Harrison Ford) against Soviet KGB agents led by Irina Spalko (Cate Blanchett) searching for a telepathic crystal skull. Jones is aided by his former lover, Marion Ravenwood (Karen Allen), and their son, Mutt Williams (Shia LaBeouf). Ray Winstone, John Hurt, and Jim Broadbent are also part of the supporting cast.

Screenwriters Jeb Stuart, Jeffrey Boam, Frank Darabont, Lucas and Nathanson wrote drafts before Koepp's script satisfied the producers. The filmmakers intended to pay tribute to the science fiction B-movies of the 1950s era. Shooting began on June 18, 2007, at various locations in New Mexico, New Haven, Connecticut, Hawaii, and Fresno, California, as well as on sound stages in Los Angeles. To maintain aesthetic continuity with the previous films, the crew relied on traditional stunt work instead of computer-generated stunt doubles, and cinematographer Janusz Kamiński studied Douglas Slocombe's style from the previous films.

The film premiered at the 2008 Cannes Film Festival on May 18, 2008 and was released worldwide on May 22, 2008. It received generally positive reviews from critics but mixed responses from audiences. Critics praised the film for its cast, action sequences, pulpy tone, John Williams's musical score, but criticized the dialogue, storyline, pacing, and overuse of CGI. It was also a financial success like the previous three films in the series, grossing over $790 million worldwide, becoming the franchise's highest-grossing film when not adjusted for inflation, as well as the second-highest-grossing film of 2008.

Indiana Jones and the Kingdom of the Crystal Skull is also the last film in the Indiana Jones franchise to be distributed by Paramount Pictures, as The Walt Disney Company became the distributor of its future films following the company's acquisition of Lucasfilm in October 2012, with Paramount still retaining this film and its predecessors and receiving "financial participation" from any additional films beginning with Indiana Jones and the Dial of Destiny, which is scheduled for release on June 30, 2023, with Ford set to reprise his role.

Plot

In 1957, Soviet KGB agents, working under Irina Spalko, kidnap Indiana Jones and his partner George "Mac" MicHale. The Soviets infiltrate a secret government warehouse, located in Nevada, labeled "Hangar 51", and force Jones to locate a mummified alien corpse from the Roswell UFO incident, which he was forced to work on 10 years earlier. Shortly after retrieving the corpse, Mac reveals he has become a double agent on the KGB’s payroll. Jones unsuccessfully attempts to steal the body, and fights with Spalko's henchman Dovchenko, before escaping to a nearby model town right before an atomic bomb test. He takes shelter in a lead-lined refrigerator, and FBI agents eventually rescue, decontaminate, and interrogate him, suspecting him of working for the Soviets. Though eventually freed, Jones is put on an indefinite leave of absence from Marshall College, and dean Charles Stanforth resigns to spare Jones from being fired.

Greaser Mutt Williams approaches Jones, notifying him that Jones’ former colleague, Professor Harold Oxley, found a crystal skull in Peru, but has since been kidnapped along with Mutt's mother, Marion, who went after him. Jones tells Mutt of the legend of crystal skulls found in Akator, and Mutt gives Jones a letter from his mother, which contains a riddle from Oxley in an ancient language. Two Soviet agents attempt to capture them, but Jones and Mutt escape and, following the riddle's meaning, reach Peru. At the local psychiatric hospital, carvings on the walls and floor of Oxley's cell lead them to the grave of Francisco de Orellana, a Conquistador who searched for Akator. They find the skull at the grave, and Jones reasons that Oxley had returned it there. While the two are departing the tomb, Mac and the Soviets take them hostage and deliver them to the Soviet camp in the Amazon jungle. There, the pair find an addled Oxley and Marion, who is actually Marion Ravenwood, an old partner of Jones'; she reveals to Jones that Mutt is his son.

Spalko believes the crystal skull belongs to an alien life form that holds great psychic power. Finding more skulls in Akator will grant the Soviet Union the ability to control the world via telepathy. Jones realizes that Oxley is attempting to communicate through automatic writing and locates a route to Akator. The next day, while en route to the ancient city, Jones and his team fight their way out of the KGB's clutches, with Dovchenko being devoured by a swarm of army ants. Mac claims he is a CIA double agent. After surviving three waterfalls in an amphibious vehicle, Jones and Oxley identify a skull-like rock formation that leads them to Akator, unaware that Mac had lied about being a CIA agent and has been dropping transceivers to allow the surviving Soviets to track them.

Jones's team evades the city's guardians, gains access to the temple, and finds it filled with artifacts from many ancient civilizations. They realize the aliens are "archaeologists" studying the different cultures of Earth. They find and enter a chamber containing 13 crystal skeletons, one of which is missing its skull. When Spalko arrives and replaces the skull, the skeletons telepathically offer to give a reward to the group, using Oxley as a translator. Her gift she wants is to simply know all the knowledge of the aliens; the aliens reanimate and transfer an overwhelming amount of knowledge into her mind, killing her. A portal to their dimension is activated, and Mac and all of the remaining Soviets are drawn in, while Jones and his team escape. As the city crumbles, a large flying saucer rises from the ruins and departs for another dimension, and the waters of the Amazon flood the hollow left by its takeoff.

The following year, Jones is reinstated at Marshall College as its associate dean, and marries Marion, with Oxley, who has regained his sanity, and Mutt as witnesses.

Cast

 Harrison Ford as Indiana Jones; To prepare for the role, the 64-year-old Ford spent three hours a day at a gym, practiced with the bullwhip for two weeks, and relied on a high-protein diet of fish and vegetables. Ford had kept fit during the series' hiatus anyway, as he hoped for another film. He performed many of his own stunts because stunt technology had become safer since 1989, and he also felt it improved his performance. Ford felt his return would also help American culture be less paranoid about aging (he refused to dye his hair for the role), because of the film's family appeal: "This is a movie which is geared not to [the young] segment of the demographic, an age-defined segment [...] We've got a great shot at breaking the movie demographic constraints." He told Koepp to add more references to his age in the script. Spielberg said Ford was not too old to play Indiana: "When a guy gets to be that age and he still packs the same punch, and he still runs just as fast and climbs just as high, he's gonna be breathing a little heavier at the end of the set piece. And I felt, 'Let's have some fun with that. Let's not hide that. Spielberg recalled the line in Raiders, "It's not the years, it's the mileage," and felt he could not tell the difference between Ford during the shoots for The Last Crusade and Kingdom of the Crystal Skull.
 Cate Blanchett as Irina Spalko, a villainous Soviet agent. Screenwriter David Koepp created the character. Frank Marshall said Spalko continued the tradition of Indiana having a love-hate relationship "with every woman he ever comes in contact with". Blanchett had wanted to play a villain for a "couple of years", and enjoyed being part of the Indiana Jones legacy as she loved the previous films. Spielberg praised Blanchett as a "master of disguise", and considers her his favorite Indiana Jones villain for coming up with much of Spalko's characteristics. Spalko's bob cut was her idea, with the character's stern looks and behavior recalling Rosa Klebb in From Russia with Love. Blanchett learned to fence for the character, but during filming, Spielberg decided to give Spalko "karate chop" skills. LaBeouf recalled Blanchett was elusive on set, and Ford was surprised when he met her on set outside of costume. He noted, "There's no aspect of her behavior that was not consistent with this bizarre person she's playing."
 Karen Allen as Marion Ravenwood (under the married name of Marion Williams). Frank Darabont's script introduced the idea of Marion Ravenwood returning as Indiana's love interest. Allen was not aware her character was in the script until Spielberg called her in January 2007, saying, "It's been announced! We're gonna make Indiana Jones 4! And guess what? You're in it!" Ford found Allen "one of the easiest people to work with [he's] ever known. She's a completely self-sufficient woman, and that's part of the character she plays. A lot of her charm and the charm of the character is there. And again, it's not an age-dependent thing. It has to do with her spirit and her nature." Allen found Ford easier to work with on this film, in contrast to the first film, where she slowly befriended the private actor.
 Ray Winstone as George "Mac" MicHale, a British agent whom Jones worked alongside in World War II, but has now allied with the Russians due to his financial problems. The character acts as a spin on Sallah and René Belloq – Jones's friend and nemesis, respectively, in Raiders of the Lost Ark. Spielberg cast Winstone as he found him "one of the most brilliant actors around", having seen Sexy Beast. Winstone tore his hamstring during filming. "I keep getting these action parts as I'm getting older," he remarked. Like John Hurt, Winstone wished to see the script prior to committing to the film. In interviews on British TV Winstone explained that he was only able to read the script if it was delivered by courier, who waited while he read the script, and returned to the US with the script once Winstone had read it. His reasoning for wanting to read the script was, "If I'm gonna be in it, I want to be in it." He gave suggestions to Spielberg, including the idea of Mac pretending to be a double agent. He also stated that once filming was completed he had to return the script, such was the secrecy about the film. He was later presented with a copy of the script to keep.
 John Hurt as Harold 'Ox' Oxley, Mutt's surrogate father and an old friend of Indiana, whom he lost contact with in 1937. Six months prior to the events of the film, he went insane after discovering the crystal skull, which commanded him to return it to Akator. Frank Darabont had suggested Hurt when he was writing the screenplay. The character is inspired by Ben Gunn from Treasure Island. Hurt wanted to read the script before signing on, unlike other cast members who came on "because Steven—you know, 'God'—was doing it. And I said, 'Well, I need to have a little bit of previous knowledge even if God is doing it.' So they sent a courier over with the script from Los Angeles, gave it to me at three o'clock in the afternoon in London, collected it again at eight o'clock in the evening, and he returned the next day to Los Angeles."
 Jim Broadbent as Dean Charles Stanforth, Dean of Marshall College and friend of Jones. Broadbent's character stands in for Marcus Brody, as actor Denholm Elliott had died in 1992. As a tribute to Elliott, the filmmakers put a portrait and a statue on the Marshall College location, and a picture on Jones's desk, saying he died shortly after Indiana's father.
 Shia LaBeouf as Mutt Williams, a young, motorcycle-riding greaser and Indiana's sidekick and son. The concept of Indiana Jones having offspring was introduced in The Young Indiana Jones Chronicles, in which Old Indy is shown to have a daughter. During development of Kingdom of the Crystal Skull, this idea was incorporated into Frank Darabont's script, with Indiana and Marion having a 13-year-old daughter. However, Spielberg found this too similar to The Lost World: Jurassic Park, so a son was created instead. Koepp credited the character's creation to Jeff Nathanson and Lucas. Koepp wanted to make Mutt into a nerd, but Lucas refused, explaining he had to resemble Marlon Brando in The Wild One; "he needs to be what Indiana Jones's father thought of [him]—the curse returns in the form of his own son—he's everything a father can't stand". LaBeouf was Spielberg's first choice for the role, having been impressed by his performance in Holes. Excited at the prospect of being in an Indiana Jones film, LaBeouf signed on without reading the script and did not know what character he would play. He worked out and gained  of muscle for the role, and also repeatedly watched the other films to get into character. LaBeouf also watched Blackboard Jungle, Rebel Without a Cause and The Wild One to get into his character's mindset, copying mannerisms and words from characters in those films, such as the use of a switchblade as a weapon. Lucas also consulted on the greaser look, joking that LaBeouf was "sent to the American Graffiti school of greaserland". LaBeouf pulled his rotator cuff when filming his duel with Spalko, which was his first injury in his career, an injury which worsened throughout filming. He later pulled his groin.

Additionally, Igor Jijikine portrays Russian Colonel Antonin Dovchenko, Spalko's second-in-command. His character stands in for the heavily built henchmen that Pat Roach played in the three previous films, as Roach died in 2004 from throat cancer. Joel Stoffer and Neil Flynn have minor roles as FBI agents Taylor and Paul Smith interrogating Indiana in a scene following the opening sequence. Alan Dale plays General Ross, who protests Indiana's innocence. Andrew Divoff and Pasha D. Lychnikoff play Soviet agents Grant and Roosevelt, respectively. Spielberg cast Russian-speaking actors so their accents would be authentic. Ilia Volok and Dimitri Diatchenko play Russian Suit and Spalko's right-hand man Dimitri who battle Indiana at Marshall College. Diatchenko bulked up to 250 pounds to look menacing, and his role was originally minor with 10 days of filming. When shooting the fight, Ford accidentally hit his chin, and Spielberg liked Diatchenko's humorous looking reaction, so he expanded his role to three months of filming. Ernie Reyes Jr. plays a cemetery guard. Chet Hanks plays Student in Library.

Sean Connery turned down an offer to cameo as Henry Jones, Sr., as he found retirement too enjoyable. Lucas stated that in hindsight it was good that Connery did not briefly appear, as it would disappoint the audience when his character would not join the film's adventure. Ford joked, "I'm old enough to play my own father in this one." Connery later admitted that his true reason for turning the part down was that it was too small, stating: "It was not that generous a part, worth getting back into the harness and go for. And they had taken the story in a different line anyway, so the father of Indy was kind of really not that important. I had suggested they kill him in the movie, it would have taken care of it better." The film addresses Connery's absence by Indiana implying that both Henry, Sr. and Marcus Brody (played in the previous films by Denholm Elliott, who died in 1992) died before the film's events. Connery later stated that he liked the film, praising it as "rather good" but also "rather long." Michael Sheard, who portrayed Adolf Hitler in the third film, expressed interest in appearing in the film, but he died in August 2005.

John Rhys-Davies was asked to reprise his role as Sallah as a guest in the wedding scene. He turned it down as he felt his character deserved a more substantial role.

Production

Development
In 1979, George Lucas and Steven Spielberg made a deal with Paramount Pictures for five Indiana Jones films. Following the 1989 release of Indiana Jones and the Last Crusade, Lucas let the series end as he felt he could not think of a good plot device to drive the next installment. He chose instead to produce the prequel television series The Young Indiana Jones Chronicles. Harrison Ford played Indiana in one episode, narrating his adventures in 1920 Chicago. When Lucas shot Ford's role in December 1992, he realized the scene opened up the possibility of a film with an older Indiana set in the 1950s. The film could reflect a science fiction 1950s B-movie, with aliens as the plot device. Meanwhile, Spielberg believed he was going to mature as a filmmaker after making the trilogy and felt his role in any future installments would be relegated to that of mere producer.

Ford disliked the new angle, telling Lucas, "No way am I being in a Steven Spielberg movie like that." Spielberg himself, who depicted aliens in Close Encounters of the Third Kind and E.T. the Extra-Terrestrial, resisted it. Lucas came up with a story, which Jeb Stuart turned into a script from October 1993 to May 1994. (Stuart had previously written The Fugitive, which starred Ford.) Lucas wanted Indiana to get married, which would allow Henry Jones, Sr. to return, expressing concern over whether his son is happy with what he has accomplished. After he learned that Joseph Stalin was interested in psychic warfare, he decided to have Soviets as the villains and the aliens to have psychic powers. Following Stuart's next draft, Lucas hired Last Crusade writer Jeffrey Boam to write the next three versions, the last of which was completed in March 1996. Three months later, Independence Day was released, and Spielberg told Lucas he would not make another alien invasion film. Lucas decided to focus on the Star Wars prequels.

In a 2000 interview, Spielberg said that his children constantly asked when he would make the next Indiana Jones film, and that the project would soon be revived. The same year, Ford, Lucas, Spielberg, Frank Marshall and Kathleen Kennedy met during the American Film Institute's tribute to Ford, and decided they wanted to enjoy the experience of making an Indiana Jones film again. Spielberg also found returning to the series a respite from his many dark films during this period, such as A.I. Artificial Intelligence, Minority Report, and Munich. Lucas convinced Spielberg to use aliens in the plot by saying they were not "extraterrestrials", but "interdimensional", with this concept taking inspiration in the superstring theory. Spielberg and Lucas discussed the central idea of a B-movie involving aliens, and Lucas suggested using the crystal skulls to ground the idea. Lucas found those artifacts as fascinating as the Ark of the Covenant, and had intended to feature them for a Young Indiana Jones episode before the show's cancellation. M. Night Shyamalan was hired to write for an intended 2002 shoot, but he was overwhelmed writing a sequel to a film he loved like Raiders of the Lost Ark, and claimed it was difficult to get Ford, Spielberg and Lucas to focus. Stephen Gaghan and Tom Stoppard were also approached.

Frank Darabont, who wrote various Young Indiana Jones episodes, was hired to write in May 2002. His script, entitled Indiana Jones and the City of Gods, was set in the 1950s, with ex-Nazis pursuing Jones. Spielberg conceived the idea because of real life figures such as Juan Perón in Argentina, who protected Nazi war criminals. Darabont claimed Spielberg loved the script, but Lucas had issues with it, and decided to take over writing himself. Lucas and Spielberg acknowledged the 1950s setting could not ignore the Cold War, and the Soviets were more plausible villains. Spielberg decided he could not satirize the Nazis after directing Schindler's List, while Ford noted, "We plum[b] wore the Nazis out."

Jeff Nathanson met with Spielberg and Lucas in August 2004 and turned in the next drafts in October and November 2005, titled The Atomic Ants. David Koepp continued on from there, giving his script the subtitle Destroyer of Worlds, based on the J. Robert Oppenheimer quote. It was changed to Kingdom of the Crystal Skull, as Spielberg found it more inviting a title and actually named the plot device of the crystal skulls. Lucas insisted on the Kingdom part. Koepp's "bright [title] idea" was Indiana Jones and the Son of Indiana Jones, and Spielberg had also considered having the title name the aliens as The Mysterians, but dropped that when he remembered that was another film's title. Koepp collaborated with Raiders of the Lost Ark screenwriter Lawrence Kasdan on the film's "love dialogue."

Filming

Unlike the previous Indiana Jones films, Spielberg shot the entire film in the United States, stating he did not want to be away from his family. Shooting began on June 18, 2007, in Deming, New Mexico. An extensive chase scene set at the fictional Marshall College was filmed between June 28 and July 7 at Yale University in New Haven, Connecticut (where Spielberg's son Theo was studying). To keep in line with the fact the story takes place in the 1950s, several facades were changed, although signs were put up in between shots to tell the public what the store or restaurant actually was.

Afterwards, they filmed scenes set in the Amazon jungle in Hilo, Hawaii until August. Indiana Jones and the Kingdom of the Crystal Skull was the biggest film shot in Hawaii since Waterworld, and was estimated to generate US$22 million to $45 million in the local economy. Because of an approaching hurricane, Spielberg was unable to shoot a fight at a waterfall, so he sent the second unit to film shots of Brazil's and Argentina's Iguazu Falls. These were digitally combined into the fight, which was shot at the Universal backlot.

Half the film was scheduled to shoot on five sound stages at Los Angeles: Downey, Sony, Warner Bros., Paramount and Universal. Filming moved to Chandler Field in Fresno, California, substituting for Mexico City International Airport, on October 11, 2007. After shooting aerial shots of Chandler Airport and a DC-3 on the morning of October 12, 2007, filming wrapped. Although he originally found no need for re-shoots after viewing his first cut of the film, Spielberg decided to add an establishing shot filmed on February 29, 2008, in Pasadena, California.

Design
Spielberg and Janusz Kamiński, who has shot all of the director's films since 1993's Schindler's List, reviewed the previous films to study Douglas Slocombe's style. "I didn't want Janusz to modernize and bring us into the 21st century", Spielberg explained. "I still wanted the film to have a lighting style not dissimilar to the work Doug Slocombe had achieved, which meant that both Janusz and I had to swallow our pride. Janusz had to approximate another cinematographer's look, and I had to approximate this younger director's look that I thought I had moved away from after almost two decades." Spielberg also hired production designer Guy Hendrix Dyas after admiring his design work for Superman Returns. Spielberg did not want to fast cut action scenes, relying on his script instead for a fast pace, and had confirmed in 2002 that he would not shoot the film digitally, a format Lucas had adopted. Lucas felt "it looks like it was shot three years after Last Crusade. The people, the look of it, everything. You'd never know there was 20 years between shooting." Kamiński commented upon watching the three films back-to-back, he was amazed how each of them advanced technologically, but were all nevertheless consistent, neither too brightly or darkly lit.

While shooting War of the Worlds in late 2004, Spielberg met with stunt coordinator Vic Armstrong, who doubled for Ford in the previous films, to discuss three action sequences he had envisioned. However, Armstrong was filming The Mummy: Tomb of the Dragon Emperor during shooting of Kingdom of the Crystal Skull, so Dan Bradley was hired instead. Bradley and Spielberg used previsualization for all the action scenes, except the motorcycle chase at Marshall College, because that idea was conceived after the animators had left. Bradley drew traditional storyboards instead, and was given free rein to create dramatic moments, just as Raiders of the Lost Ark second unit director Michael D. Moore did when filming the truck chase. Spielberg improvised on set, changing the location of Mutt and Spalko's duel from the ground to on top of vehicles.

The Ark of the Covenant is seen in a broken crate during the Hangar 51 opening sequence. Lucasfilm used the same prop from Raiders of the Lost Ark. Guards were hired to protect the highly sought-after piece of film memorabilia during the day of its use. A replica of the staff carried by Charlton Heston in The Ten Commandments was also used to populate the set to illustrate the hangar's history.

Effects

Producer Frank Marshall stated in 2003 that the film would use traditional stunt work so as to be consistent with the previous films. CGI was used to remove the visible safety wires on the actors when they did their stunts, such as when Indy swings on a lamp with his whip. Timed explosives were used for a scene where Indiana drives a truck through crates. During the take, an explosive failed to detonate and landed in the seat beside Ford. It did not go off and he was not injured.

Spielberg stated before production began that very few CGI effects would be used to maintain consistency with the other films. During filming significantly more CGI work was done than initially anticipated as in many cases it proved to be more practical. There ended up being a total of about 450 CGI shots in the film, with an estimated 30% of the film's shots containing CG matte paintings. Spielberg initially wanted brushstrokes to be visible on the paintings for added consistency with the previous films, but decided against it. The script also required a non-deforested jungle for a chase scene, but this would have been unsafe and much CGI work was done to create the jungle action sequence. Visual effects supervisor Pablo Helman (who worked on Lucas's Star Wars: Episode I – The Phantom Menace and Star Wars: Episode II – Attack of the Clones as well as Spielberg's War of the Worlds and Munich) traveled to Brazil and Argentina to photograph elements that were composited into the final images. Industrial Light and Magic then effectively created a virtual jungle with a geography like the real Amazon.

The appearance of a live alien and flying saucer was in flux. Spielberg wanted the alien to resemble a Grey alien, and also rejected early versions of the saucer that looked "too Close Encounters". Art director Christian Alzmann said the esthetic was "looking at a lot of older B-movie designs—but trying to make that look more real and gritty to fit in with the Indy universe." Other reference for the visual effects work included government tapes of nuclear tests, and video reference of real prairie dogs shot in 1080p by Nathan Edward Denning.

Music

John Williams began composing the score in October 2007; 10 days of recording sessions wrapped on March 6, 2008, at Sony Pictures Studios. Williams described composing for the Indiana Jones universe again as "like sitting down and finishing a letter that you started 25 years ago". He reused Indiana's theme (The Raiders March) and also Marion's from Raiders of the Lost Ark, and also composed five new motifs for Mutt, Spalko and the skull. Williams gave Mutt's a swashbuckling feel, and homaged film noir and 1950s B-movies for Spalko and the crystal skull respectively. The movie's first scene is accompanied by Elvis Presley's 1956 version of "Hound Dog", arguably the biggest hit of the movie's era, and an RIAA-certified 4× Platinum recording. As an in-joke, Williams incorporated a measure and a half of Johannes Brahms' "Academic Festival Overture" when Indiana and Mutt crash into the library. The soundtrack features a Continuum, an instrument often used for sound effects instead of music. The Concord Music Group released the soundtrack on May 20, 2008.

Release
The Kingdom of the Crystal Skull premiered at the Cannes Film Festival on May 18, 2008, a couple of days ahead of its worldwide May 21–23 release. It was the first Spielberg film since 1982's E.T. the Extra-Terrestrial to premiere at Cannes. The film was released in approximately 4,000 theaters in the United States, and dubbed into 25 languages for its worldwide release. More than 12,000 release prints were distributed, which is the largest in Paramount Pictures' history. Although Spielberg insisted his films only be watched traditionally using a film projector at theaters, Paramount chose to release the film in digital cinemas as part of a scheme to convert 10,000 U.S. cinemas to the format. The Kingdom of the Crystal Skull is also notable for being the last film in the series to be distributed by Paramount, as Walt Disney Studios will release the upcoming fifth film, since its parent company's acquisition of Lucasfilm in 2012.

Secrecy
Frank Marshall remarked, "In today's information age, secrecy has been a real challenge. ... People actually said, 'No, we're going to respect Steven's vision.'" Prior to release, moviegoers on the Internet scrutinized numerous photos and the film's promotional Lego sets in hope of understanding plot details. Spielberg biographer Ian Freer wrote, "What Indy IV is actually about has been the great cultural guessing game of 2007/08. Yet, it has to be said, there is something refreshing about being ten weeks away from a giant blockbuster and knowing next to nothing about it." To distract investigative fans from the film's title during filming, five fake titles were registered with the Motion Picture Association of America; The City of Gods, The Destroyer of Worlds, The Fourth Corner of the Earth, The Lost City of Gold and The Quest for the Covenant. Lucas and Spielberg had also wanted to keep Karen Allen's return a secret until the film's release, but decided to confirm it at the 2007 Comic-Con.

An extra in the film, Tyler Nelson, violated his nondisclosure agreement in an interview with the Edmond Sun on September 17, 2007, which was then picked up by the mainstream media. It is unknown if he remained in the final cut. At Nelson's request, The Edmond Sun subsequently pulled the story from its website. On October 2, 2007, a Superior Court order was filed finding that Nelson knowingly violated the agreement. The terms of the settlement were not disclosed. A number of production photos and sensitive documents pertaining to the film's production budget were also stolen from Spielberg's production office. The Los Angeles County Sheriff's Department set up a sting operation after being alerted by a webmaster that the thief might try to sell the photos. On October 4, 2007, the seller, 37-year-old Roderick Eric Davis, was arrested. He pleaded guilty to two felony counts and was sentenced to two years and four months in prison.

Marketing

Howard Roffman, president of Lucas Licensing, attributed the film's large marketing campaign to it having been "nineteen years since the last film, and we are sensing a huge pent-up demand for everything Indy". Marketing relied heavily on the public's nostalgia for the series, with products taking inspiration from all four films. Paramount spent at least $150 million to promote the film, whereas most film promotions range from $70 to 100 million. As well as fans, the film also needed to appeal to younger viewers. Licensing deals include Expedia, Dr Pepper, Burger King, M&M's, Snickers, Lunchables, and Papa John's. Paramount along with Blockbuster sponsored an Indiana Jones open wheel car for Marco Andretti in the 2008 Indianapolis 500, and his racing suit was designed to resemble Indiana Jones's outfit. Andretti would go on to finish third in the race. The distributor also paired with M&M's to sponsor the #18 Joe Gibbs Racing Toyota, with NASCAR driver Kyle Busch behind the wheel, in the 2008 Dodge Challenger 500 at Darlington Raceway. Kyle Busch and the #18 team won the race and visited victory lane with Indiana Jones on the car. With the film's release, producer Frank Marshall and UNESCO worked together to promote conservation of World Heritage Sites around the world. Disneyland hosted "Indiana Jones Summer of Hidden Mysteries" to promote the film's release.

The Boston-based design studio Creative Pilot created the packaging style for the film's merchandise, which merged Drew Struzan's original illustrations "with a fresh new look, which showcases the whip, a map and exotic hieroglyphic patterns". Hasbro, Lego, Sideshow Collectibles, Topps, Diamond Select, Hallmark Cards, and Cartamundi all sold products. A THQ mobile game based on the film was released, as was a Lego video game based on the past films. Lego also released a series of computer-animated spoofs, Lego Indiana Jones and the Raiders of the Lost Brick, directed by Peder Pedersen. Stern Pinball released a new Indiana Jones pinball machine, designed by John Borg, based on all four films. From October 2007 to April 2008, the re-edited episodes of The Young Indiana Jones Chronicles were released in three DVD box sets.

Random House, Dark Horse Comics, Diamond Comic Distributors, Scholastic, and DK published books, including James Rollins's novelization of Kingdom of the Crystal Skull, a two-issue comic book adaptation written by John Jackson Miller and drawn by Luke Ross (Samurai: Heaven and Earth), children's novelizations of all four films, the Indiana Jones Adventures comic book series aimed at children, and the official Indiana Jones Magazine. Scholastic featured Indiana and Mutt on the covers of Scholastic News and Scholastic Maths, to the concern of parents, though Jack Silbert, editor of the latter, felt the film would interest children in archaeology.

Home media
The film was released on DVD and Blu-ray Disc in North America on October 14, 2008, and in the UK on November 10. This THX certified release includes a two-disc special-edition DVD, a two-disc special-edition Blu-ray, and a one-disc edition DVD. The film made its worldwide television premiere on USA on December 9, 2010. On September 18, 2012, it was re-released on Blu-ray as part of Indiana Jones: The Complete Adventures.

In 2021, a remastered 4K version of the film was released on Ultra HD Blu-ray, produced using scans of the original negatives. It was released as part of a box set for the then four films in the Indiana Jones film series.

As of October 16, 2013, the film has made $117,239,631 in revenue.

Reception

Box office

Indiana Jones and the Kingdom of the Crystal Skull is distributed by one entity, Paramount, but owned by another, Lucasfilm. The pre-production arrangement between the two organizations granted Paramount 12.5% of the film's revenue. As the $185 million budget was larger than the original $125 million estimate, Lucas, Spielberg and Ford turned down large upfront salaries so Paramount could cover the film's costs. In order for Paramount to see a profit beyond its distribution fee, the film had to make over $400 million. At that point, Lucas, Spielberg, Ford, and those with smaller profit-sharing deals would also begin to collect their cut.

The film was released on May 22, 2008, in North America, playing at 4,260 theaters. At that time, it achieved the third-highest number of screenings, behind Pirates of the Caribbean: At World's End and Spider-Man 3. For its opening day, the film grossed $25 million, making it the fourth-highest Thursday opening, behind Star Wars: Episode II – Attack of the Clones, The Matrix Reloaded and Star Wars: Episode III – Revenge of the Sith. In its opening weekend, it grossed an estimated $101 million and ranked number one at the box office. The film would go on to set opening weekend records for both a Steven Spielberg film and Harrison Ford film, breaking the previous records held by The Lost World: Jurassic Park and Air Force One simultaneously. Within its first five days of release, it grossed $151.1 million, combined with $126 million from the four-day opening weekend. It ranked as the second-biggest Memorial Day weekend release, after Pirates of the Caribbean: At World's End. During Memorial Day, the film had already generated a total of $26.7 million, becoming the second-highest Monday gross of any film, trailing only behind Spider-Man 2. It was the third-most-successful film of 2008 domestically, behind The Dark Knight and Iron Man, respectively, and the year's second-highest-grossing film internationally, behind The Dark Knight. In February 2010, it was the 25th-highest-grossing film of all time domestically, and 44th-highest-grossing worldwide, as well as the most financially successful Indiana Jones film when not adjusted for inflation of ticket prices.

Critical response
Indiana Jones and the Kingdom of the Crystal Skull received strongly polarized but mostly positive reviews; as a result, it has been nominated both for numerous "best of" and "worst of" awards. The website's critical consensus reads, "Though the plot elements are certainly familiar, Indiana Jones and the Kingdom of the Crystal Skull still delivers the thrills and Harrison Ford's return in the title role is more than welcome." Metacritic, gives the film a weighted average rating of 65 out of 100, based on 40 critics, indicating "generally favorable reviews". Surveys conducted by CinemaScore indicated an average rating of "B" from audiences, on an A+ to F scale, down from the previous film's "A".

Roger Ebert gave the film three and a half stars out of four, the same rating he gave The Last Crusade, finding it "same old, same old", but what "I want it to be", particularly as "a lover of pulp fiction": "What I want is goofy action—lots of it. I want man-eating ants, swordfights between two people balanced on the backs of speeding jeeps, caverns of gold, vicious femme fatales, plunges down three waterfalls in a row, and the explanation for flying saucers. And throw in lots of monkeys." Leonard Maltin also gave the film 3½ stars out of 4, more than he gave Temple of Doom and Last Crusade, and wrote that "Indy returns with the same brand of high adventure that marked the original Raiders of the Lost Ark." Empire's Damon Wise criticized the use of CGI but praised Ford's performance and wrote that "It won't change your life but, if you're in the right frame of mind, it will change your mood: you might wince, you might groan, you might beg to differ on the big, silly climax, but you'll never stop smiling."

James Berardinelli gave the film 2 stars out of 4, calling it "the most lifeless of the series" and "simply [not] a very good motion picture." Margaret Pomeranz of At the Movies gave the film 2½ stars out of 5, saying that the filmmakers "had 19 years since the last Indiana Jones movie to come up with something truly exciting and fresh, but I feel there's a certain laziness and cynicism in this latest adventure." Associated Press reported that J. Sperling Reich, writing for FilmStew.com, said: "It really looked like they were going through the motions. It really looked like no one had their heart in it." USA Today stated reviews were "mixed" and reviewers felt the "movie suffers from predictable plot points and cheesy special effects."

International reaction
The Communist Party of the Russian Federation called for a ban on the film, accusing the production team of "demonizing" the Soviet Union. Spielberg responded: "When we decided the fourth installment would take place in 1957, we had no choice but to make the Russians the enemies. World War II had just ended and the Cold War had begun. The U.S. didn't have any other enemies at the time." 

The film's depiction of Peru also received criticism from the Peruvian and Mexican public.

Audience reception and legacy
According to Associated Press, Indiana Jones and the Kingdom of the Crystal Skull received a "respectful" but "far from glowing" reception from Indiana Jones fans, and that "some viewers at its first press screening loved it, some called it slick and enjoyable though formulaic, some said it was not worth the 19-year wait." South Park parodied the film in the episode "The China Probrem", broadcast five months after the film's release. The episode parodied the negative fan reaction, with the characters filing a police report against Lucas and Spielberg for "raping Indiana Jones".

Some disappointed Indiana Jones fans used the term "nuking the fridge", a reference to the scene in which Jones survives a nuclear blast by hiding in a refrigerator, to denote the point when a franchise crosses into the absurd, similar to "jumping the shark". This phrase has appeared across the internet, and was chosen as #5 on Time magazine's list of "top ten buzzwords" of 2008. Asked about the scene and phrase, Spielberg said: "Blame me. Don't blame George. That was my silly idea ... I'm proud of that. I'm glad I was able to bring that into popular culture." Lucas denied this, saying Spielberg was "protecting him". According to Lucas, he had assembled a dossier of research data to convince Spielberg; Lucas stated that his research claimed the odds of surviving in the refrigerator are about "50-50."

The mixed fanbase reaction did not surprise Lucas, who was familiar with mixed response to the Star Wars prequels, and predicted that "we're all going to get people throwing tomatoes at us." David Koepp said: "I knew I was going to get hammered from a number of quarters [but] what I liked about the way the movie ended up playing was it was popular with families. I like that families really embraced it." Although Spielberg said "I'm very happy with the movie. I always have been", he also said "I sympathize with people who didn't like the MacGuffin [the interdimensional beings] because I never liked the MacGuffin."

At the 2010 Cannes Film Festival, LaBeouf told Los Angeles Times he had "dropped the ball on the legacy that people loved and cherished" and felt that "the movie could have been updated ... we just misinterpreted what we were trying to satiate." In 2011, in response to LaBeouf's comments, Harrison Ford said: "I think I told [LaBeouf] he was a f***ing idiot ... As an actor, I think it's my obligation to support the film without making a complete ass of myself. Shia is ambitious, attentive and talented—and he's learning how to deal with a situation which is very unique and difficult." LaBeouf said he regretted his comments and their effect on his relationship with Spielberg: "He told me there's a time to be a human being and have an opinion, and there's a time to sell cars. It brought me freedom, but it also killed my spirits because this was a dude I looked up to like a sensei."

Film critic Matt Zoller Seitz praised the film despite its alienation of fans, understanding that the film was "more an ensemble piece" compared to the previous films in the series, but adding that "there was a point to this approach: Crystal Skull was Spielberg's immense and spectacular version of an Old Man movie.... rather like the films Howard Hawks and John Ford were making in the mid- to late '60s". Seitz also considers the "nuke the fridge" scene as one of the series' best, stating that "It brings Indy forward into the world that birthed Steven Spielberg and his Boomer-fueled fantasies of earlier generations. And the construction of it, the shots and cuts, is brilliant. The ramping up. The satirical touches. And the 'nuclear family' pun at the heart of it."

Accolades
The film was nominated for Best Action Movie at the 2009 Critics' Choice Awards. The Visual Effects Society nominated it for Best Single Visual Effect of the Year (the valley destruction), Best Outstanding Matte Paintings, Best Models and Miniatures, and Best Created Environment in a Feature Motion Picture (the inside of the temple). The film ranks 453rd on Empires 2008 list of the 500 greatest movies of all time. It was nominated at the Saturn Awards for Best Science Fiction Film, Best Director, Best Actor, Best Supporting Actor, Best Costumes and Best Special Effects. It won Best Costumes. At the 51st Grammy Awards, John Williams won an award for the Mutt Williams theme.

In 2008, the film won the Razzie Award for Worst Prequel, Remake, Rip-off or Sequel. Comcast voted it the 11th-worst film sequel of all time. Paste magazine ranked the movie 10th on its list "The 20 Worst Sequels to Good Movies". Listverse.com ranked the film 8th on its list of the "Top 10 Worst Movie Sequels".

Lawsuit
In late 2012, the director of the Institute of Archaeology of Belize, Dr. Jaime Awe, sued Lucasfilm, Disney, and Paramount Pictures on behalf of the country Belize for using the Mitchell-Hedges skull's "likeness" in the film. (Awe claimed that if the Mitchell-Hedges skull was actually found in Belize, then it had been stolen from his country, and the defendants were profiting off its likeness.)

Sequel

On March 15, 2016, Walt Disney Studios announced that Spielberg and Ford would both return for a fifth Indiana Jones film, initially scheduled for release on July 19, 2019. After multiple delays, this was finally changed to June 30, 2023. In February 2020, it was revealed that Spielberg had stepped down as the film's director and that James Mangold had entered negotiations to direct. Spielberg, Kennedy, and Marshall will serve as producers.

See also
 List of films featuring extraterrestrials

References

Further reading

External links

 
  at 
 
 
 
 
 

2000s action adventure films
2000s American films
2008 films
American action adventure films
American sequel films
Crystal skull
Films about educators
Films about extraterrestrial life
Films about families
Films about old age
Films about telepathy
Films directed by Steven Spielberg
Films produced by Frank Marshall
Films scored by John Williams
Films set in 1957
Films set in Connecticut
Films set in Nevada
Films set in Peru
Films shot in Argentina
Films shot in California
Films shot in Connecticut
Films shot in Foz do Iguaçu
Films shot in Hawaii
Films shot in Los Angeles
Films shot in New Mexico
Films with screenplays by George Lucas
Films with screenplays by David Koepp
Cold War films
Cold War spy films
Indiana Jones films
Jungle adventure films
Lucasfilm films
Paramount Pictures films
Roswell incident in fiction
Treasure hunt films
Films about the Russian Mafia
2000s English-language films